Dayr Sim'an, also transliterated Deir Semaan and Deir Sam'an (lit. "the Monastery of Simon") may refer to the following places in northern Syria:

Church of Saint Simeon Stylites, a 5th-century church complex near Aleppo
Deir Sharqi, a village near Maarrat al-Nu'man, formerly called Dayr al-Naqira or Dayr Sim'an